Sabina Ilgizarovna Imaikina (born 25 March 1993) is a Russian former pair skater. Competing with Andrei Novoselov, she won two silver medals on the 2008 ISU Junior Grand Prix series and qualified for the 2008–09 JGP Final, where they placed 5th. At the 2009 Russian Championships, the pair placed fifth on the senior level and took bronze on the junior level. They were coached by Valeri Tiukov and Valentina Tiukova in Perm. They parted ways at the end of the season. 

Imaikina teamed up with Semen Stepanov in 2009 and finished 10th at the 2010 Russian Championships. In 2010, she partnered with Konstantin Bezmaternikh and finished 10th at the 2011 Russian Championships. In February 2011, they announced they would no longer skate together.

Programs

With Novoselov

Competitive highlights

With Bezmaternikh

With Stepanov

With Novoselov

References

External links 

 
 

1993 births
Russian female pair skaters
Living people
Sportspeople from Perm, Russia
Competitors at the 2011 Winter Universiade